Anou Achra Lemoun is a cave of Djurdjura in Algeria.

References

Caves of Algeria